The 2016 ACC Championship Game was the 12th football championship game for the Atlantic Coast Conference. The Clemson Tigers defeated the Virginia Tech Hokies, 42–35. The two programs also met five years earlier in the 2011 ACC Championship Game. The ACC Championship Game had been played at Bank of America Stadium in Charlotte, North Carolina since 2010, but the ACC announced it would move its neutral site championships out of North Carolina for the 2016 season in response to the state's controversial HB2 law. The 2016 championship game was played at Camping World Stadium in Orlando, Florida.

Teams

Clemson Tigers
The Tigers qualified for the game by winning the ACC Atlantic Division with a conference record of 7–1, tied with the Louisville Cardinals, who Clemson beat on October 1, 2016, 42–36.

Virginia Tech Hokies
The Hokies qualified for the game by clinching the ACC Coastal Division following North Carolina's loss at home on November 25, 2016, to NC State, 28–21. The Hokies' conference record was 6–2.

Scoring summary

Source:

Statistics

References

Championship
ACC Championship Game
Clemson Tigers football games
Virginia Tech Hokies football games
December 2016 sports events in the United States
ACC Championship